The Piedmontese regional election of 1995 took place on 23 April 1995.

For the first time the President of the Region was directly elected by the people, although the election was not yet binding and the President-elect could have been replaced during the term.

Enzo Ghigo (Forza Italia) was surprisingly elected President of the Region, defeating Giuseppe Pichetto (independent of the centre-left) and Domenico Comino (Northern League Piedmont).

Forza Italia, founded the year before by Silvio Berlusconi, formed a joint list with the People's Pole and became the largest party in the region with 26.7% of the vote, while the Democrats of the Left came second with 21.7%.

Electoral system
Regional elections in Piedmont were ruled by the "Tatarella law" (approved in 1995), which provided for a mixed electoral system: four fifths of the regional councilors were elected in provincial constituencies by proportional representation, using the largest remainder method with a droop quota and open lists, while the residual votes and the unassigned seats were grouped into a "single regional constituency", where the whole ratios and the highest remainders were divided with the Hare method among the provincial party lists; one fifth of the council seats instead was reserved for regional lists and assigned with a majoritarian system: the leader of the regional list that scored the highest number of votes was elected to the presidency of the Region while the other candidates were elected regional councilors.

A threshold of 3% had been established for the provincial lists, which, however, could still have entered the regional council if the regional list to which they were connected had scored at least 5% of valid votes.

The panachage was also allowed: the voter can indicate a candidate for the presidency but prefer a provincial list connected to another candidate.

Parties and candidates

Results

Elections in Piedmont
1995 elections in Italy